Fires is the ninth studio album by Irish singer Ronan Keating. The album was released on 3 September 2012, with a special deluxe, signed edition to be available from the Universal Music official store. It is his fifth album to contain original material and his first in six years following Bring You Home.

Promotion
 
To promote the record, Keating embarked on a short promotional tour, which began on 3 August 2012, with the Summarfestivalur in The Faroe Islands. Other dates included the Þjóðhátíð festival in Iceland on 5 August, and the Festas do Mar in Portugal on 17 August as well as appearances in Germany and Australia. Keating also undertook two weeks of radio promotion around radio stations in the last week of August. A arena tour of the UK and Ireland commenced in January 2013.

Singles
 "Fires", the album's title track, premiered on 21 July 2012 on BBC Radio 2. The music video for the song premiered on 1 August 2012, via YouTube. The single as released as a digital download on 2 September 2012. The song was only available as a digital download and sold 10,000 copies.
 "Wasted Light", is the second track on the album and premiered on 3 December 2012. The music video part live, part animated.

Critical reception
On 22 August 2012 the album was voted album of the week by BBC Radio 2.

Fires received positive reviews from BBC Music, critic Mike Driver declared that "a few bloopers aside, this is probably Keating’s best album since his eponymous debut."

The Daily Express gave the album a rating of 4 out of 5 and commented that "it's on songs such as Love You And Leave You that you get a whiff of a truly original artist." However, it also said that Keating had "put together something that, while slick and seamless, doesn’t really say anything new and mostly sounds a little sub-something else, largely Scissor Sisters."

Track listing

Chart performance

References

Ronan Keating albums
2012 albums
Albums produced by Rick Nowels
Albums produced by Stephen Lipson
Albums produced by Brian Rawling